The 2016 LPGA Tour was a series of professional golf tournaments for elite female golfers from around the world. The season began in the Bahamas on January 28 and ended on November 20 at the Gold Course of the Tiburón Golf Club in Naples, Florida. The tournaments are sanctioned by the United States-based Ladies Professional Golf Association (LPGA).

Schedule and results
The number in parentheses after each winners' name is the player's total number of wins in official money individual events on the LPGA Tour, including that event. Tournament and winner names in bold indicate LPGA majors.

Season leaders
Money list leaders

Full 2016 official money list

Scoring average leaders

Full 2016 scoring average list

Awards

See also
2016 Ladies European Tour
2016 Symetra Tour

References

External links
Official site

LPGA Tour seasons
LPGA Tour